Aditya Sarpotdar  is an Indian Marathi film director and costume designer best known for his blockbuster film Classmates. He started his career as a director with Uladhaal starring Ankush Choudhary and Subodh Bhave.

Personal life

Aditya is son of Ajay Sarpotdar, former president of Akhil Bharatiya Marathi Chitrapat Mahamandal, the apex Marathi film body, and grandson of filmmaker Vishwas Sarpotdar.

Filmography

References

External links 
 
 

Marathi film directors
Living people
Artists from Pune
Hindi-language film directors
Film directors from Maharashtra
Year of birth missing (living people)